Malaya Gorka is a rural locality (a village) in Nikolskoye Rural Settlement, Kaduysky District, Vologda Oblast, Russia. The population was 3 as of 2002.

Geography 
Malaya Gorka is located 17 km northeast of Kaduy (the district's administrative centre) by road. Bolshaya Gorka is the nearest rural locality.

References 

Rural localities in Kaduysky District